Antonio Hidalgo Rodríguez (15 February 1943 – 6 March 2014) was a Spanish professional footballer who played as a defender.

Career
Born in Seville, Hidalgo played for Badajoz and Celta de Vigo.

References

1943 births
2014 deaths
Spanish footballers
Association football defenders
CD Badajoz players
RC Celta de Vigo players
La Liga players
Segunda División players